is a classical Japanese anthology of one hundred Japanese waka by one hundred poets. Hyakunin isshu can be translated to "one hundred people, one poem [each]"; it can also refer to the card game of uta-garuta, which uses a deck composed of cards based on the Hyakunin Isshu.

The most famous and standard version was compiled by Fujiwara no Teika (1162–1241) while he lived in the Ogura district of Kyoto.

Compilation
One of Teika's diaries, the Meigetsuki (明月記), says that his son Tameie asked him to arrange one hundred poems for Tameie's father-in-law, Utsunomiya Yoritsuna, who was furnishing a residence near Mount Ogura; hence the full name of Ogura Hyakunin Isshu. In order to decorate screens of the residence, Fujiwara no Teika produced the calligraphy poem sheets.

Hishikawa Moronobu (1618–1694) provided woodblock portraits for each of the poets included in the anthology. Katsukawa Shunshō (1726–1793) designed prints for a full-color edition published in 1775.

In his own lifetime, Teika was better known for other work.  For example, in 1200 (Shōji 2), Teika prepared another anthology of one hundred poems for ex-Emperor Go-Toba. This was called the Shōji Hyakushu.

Poets

Poems

Poem number 1 
A poem by Emperor Tenji about the hardships of farmers. Teika chose this poem from the Gosen Wakashū:

Poem number 2
A visually-descriptive poem attributed to Empress Jitō. Teika chose this poem from the Shin Kokin Wakashū:

The original was likely based from a poem of the Man'yōshū (book 1, poem 28) by the same poet.

Poem number 26
A quite different poem is attributed to Sadaijin Fujiwara no Tadahira in the context of a very specific incident.  After abdicating, former Emperor Uda visited Mount Ogura in Yamashiro Province. He was so greatly impressed by the beauty of autumn colours of the maples that he ordered Fujiwara no Tadahira to encourage Uda's son and heir, Emperor Daigo, to visit the same area.

 was Tadahira's posthumous name, and this is the name used in William Porter's translation of the poem which observes that "[t]he maples of Mount Ogura / If they could understand / Would keep their brilliant leaves / until [t]he Ruler of this land / Pass with his Royal band."  The accompanying 18th century illustration shows a person of consequence riding an ox in a procession with attendants on foot.  The group is passing through an area of maple leaves.

Teika chose this poem from the Shūi Wakashū for the hundred poems collection:

Poem number 86
A poem by Saigyō about the pain of love. This poem was chosen from the Senzai Wakashū:

English translations
The Ogura Hyakunin Isshu has been translated into many languages and into English many times, beginning with Yone Noguchi's Hyaku Nin Isshu in English in 1907.

Other translations include:
 William N. Porter, A Hundred Verses from Old Japan (1909)
 Clay MacCauley, Hyakunin-isshu (Single Songs of a Hundred Poets) (1917)
 Tom Galt, The Little Treasury of One Hundred People, One Poem Each (1982)
 Joshua S. Mostow, Pictures of the Heart: The Hyakunin Isshu in Word and Image (1996)
 Peter MacMillan, One Hundred Poets, One Poem Each: A Treasury of Classical Japanese Verse (2008; Penguin Classics, revised edition 2018)
 Emiko Miyashita and Michael Dylan Welch, 100 Poets: Passions of the Imperial Court (2008)

Other Hyakunin Isshu anthologies
Many other anthologies compiled along the same criteria—one hundred poems by one hundred poets—include the words hyakunin isshu, notably the World War II-era , or One Hundred Patriotic Poems by One Hundred Poets.

Card game
Teika's anthology is the basis for the card game of karuta, which has been popular since the Edo period.

Many forms of playing games with Hyakunin Isshu exist in Japan, such as Uta-garuta, the basis for competitive karuta (kyōgi karuta).

See also
 Nisonin, Kyoto
 Shigureden, a museum in Kyoto about this subject

Notes

References
 Fujiwara no Sadaie, Thomas Galt. (1982).  The Little Treasury of One Hundred People, One Poem Each. Princeton: Princeton University Press. 
 Fujiwara no Sadaie, Yoritsuna Utsunomiya, William Ninnis Porter. (1979)  A Hundred Verses from Old Japan, Being a Translation of the Hyaku-nin-isshiu: Being a Translation of the Hyaku-nin-isshiu. Tokyo: Tuttle Publishing. 
 Mostow, Joshua S., ed. (1996).  Pictures of the Heart: The Hyakunin Isshu in Word and Image. Honolulu: University of Hawaii Press. ; OCLC 645187818
 新総合 図説国語 新訂版, 東京書籍株式会社, (2016), 池内輝雄・三角洋一・吉原英夫,  
SINSOUGOU ZUSETSUKOKUGO revised edition, TOKYO SHOSEKI CO., LTD.(2016), Teruo Ikeuchi・Youichi Misumi・Hideo Yosiwara.
 古語辞典 第十版, 旺文社, (2008), 松村明・山口明穂・和田利政,  
KOGOZITEN 10th edition, OBUNSHA(2008), Akari Matsumura・Akiho Yamaguchi・Toshimasa Wada.
 全訳古語辞典 第四版, 旺文社, (2011), 宮腰賢・石井正己・小田勝,  
ZENYAKU KOGOZITEN 4th edition, OBUNSYA(2011), Masaru Miyakoshi・Masami Ishii・Masaru Oda

Further reading
 One Hundred Poets, One Poem Each: A Translation of the Ogura Hyakunin Isshu, Peter McMillan, foreword by Donald Keene. New York: Columbia University Press, 2008.  
 One Hundred Poets, One Poem Each: A Treasury of Classical Japanese Verse, Peter McMillan. London: Penguin Classics, 2018.  
 100 Poets: Passions of the Imperial Court, Emiko Miyashita and Michael Dylan Welch, translators. Tokyo: PIE Books, 2008.    This book is also available as an iPad/iPhone application.

External links

Ogura Hyakunin Isshu
Ogura Hyakunin Isshu - 100 Poems by 100 Poets at University of Virginia Library Japanese Text Initiative
 

Japanese literature
Japanese poetry anthologies
Articles containing Japanese poems
Fujiwara no Teika